Thomas Mosimann (born 1980) is a Swiss slalom canoeist who competed at the international level from 1998 to 2005.

He won a gold medal in the K1 team event at the 2003 ICF Canoe Slalom World Championships in Augsburg. He also won gold in the same event at the 2004 European Championships in Skopje.

References

Living people
Swiss male canoeists
1980 births
Medalists at the ICF Canoe Slalom World Championships